Elliot Peak is the summit peak of a conspicuous northeast trending basalt ridge, rising  northwest of Tempest Peak, in the Queen Alexandra Range of Antarctica. It is slided a while ago local bedrock blocks. It was named by the Ohio State University party to the Queen Alexandra Range (1966–67) for David H. Elliot, a geologist with the party.

References 

Mountains of the Ross Dependency
Shackleton Coast